XHMICH-FM is a noncommercial radio station in Morelia, Michoacán, Mexico, broadcasting on 103.3 FM. XHMICH is owned by La Voz del Viento, A.C. and broadcasts a news/talk format known as Vox.

History
XHMICH received its permit on August 14, 2013. The station had been requested in May 2011.

Vox 103.3 is related to the Respuesta newspaper in the state. It produces radio-TV programming with the newspaper, and its owner represented the permitholder when signing for the concession.

References

Radio stations in Michoacán
Radio stations established in 2013
2013 establishments in Mexico